The National Institute for Mathematical Sciences (NIMS) is a Korean government-funded mathematics research institute. Their work focuses both basic research and applied mathematics with  industrial and medical applications. NIMS became an affiliated research institute of the Institute for Basic Science in 2012. After delays for multiple years, relocation is planned for late 2023.

Presidents
 Cho Yong Seung  (October 1, 2005–September 30, 2008)
 Kim Jeong Han (October 17, 2008–August 15, 2011) 
 Kim Dong Su (September 11, 2012–September 10, 2015) 
 Park Hyung Ju (September 18, 2015–July 6, 2017) 
 Chung Soon-yeong (January 30, 2018–January 29, 2021) 
 Kim Min-Hyun (March 15, 2021–present)

See also 
Korea Institute for Advanced Study
Institute of Mathematics

References

External links
  (English and Korean)
 Facebook (Korean)

Schools of mathematics
Mathematical institutes
Institute for Basic Science
Research institutes established in 2005
2005 establishments in South Korea
Daejeon
Research institutes in South Korea